The 2010 Formula Renault 2.0 Northern European Cup was the fifth Formula Renault 2.0 Northern European Cup season. The season began at Hockenheim on 17 April and finished on 17 October at Nürburgring, after nineteen races. Making its début in the series in 2010 was the new-specification car, designed by Barazi-Epsilon. It replaced the Tatuus chassis that had been in the series since 2000, but the Tatuus cars were still used in the secondary Formula Renault 2000 Class.

KEO Racing driver Ludwig Ghidi won the main NEC championship title, having won two races during the season – the season-opening rounds at Hockenheim – but eleven further podiums helped him to claim his first ever car racing title. Mikkel Mac of the KTR team finished the season as runner-up, winning three races at Zandvoort and two at Oschersleben, but only featured three further times on the podium. Van Amersfoort Racing duo Jeroen Mul and Liroy Stuart took the next two placings in the final championship standings, with Mul taking two victories at Zandvoort and Oschersleben, while Stuart took four second places including one behind Mul. Team Astromega driver Sam Dejonghe completed the top five. Other drivers to win races were Eurocup champion Kevin Korjus, who won each of his five starts in the series for Koiranen Bros. Motorsport, Karl-Oscar Liiv won a pair of races for MP Motorsport at Assen, with Kevin Mirocha (SL Formula Racing, Nürburgring), Daniël de Jong (MP Motorsport, Nürburgring), Genís Olivé (Epsilon Euskadi, Spa-Francorchamps), Robin Frijns (Josef Kaufmann Racing, Spa-Francorchamps) and Will Stevens (MP Motorsport, Spa-Francorchamps) all winning a race each. One race was cancelled due to poor weather conditions.

In the Formula Renault 2000 class, five victories for Dear Schilling allowed KEO Racing to claim the FR2000 title along with Ghidi's success in the main class. Dear Schilling finished 15 points clear of runner-up Johann Ledermair, a four-time class winner running for his own Ledermair Motorsport team, who in turn finished 13 points clear of Daniel Schilling, the younger brother of Dear and his team-mate at KEO Racing, a three-time winner on the season. Tony Kowalewski took two wins en route to fourth place for TKP Racing, while Frank Suntjens was winless for the Speedlover team in fifth place. Other victories were claimed by Alessio Picariello, who took wins at Most and two at Spa for SL Formula Racing, with one each for Leopold Ringbom (P1 Motorsport, Nürburgring) and Amir Mesny (Josef Kaufmann Racing, Spa-Francorchamps) in late season outings.

Teams and drivers

Race calendar and results

Standings

Drivers' championship
 Championship points were awarded on a 30, 24, 20, 17, 16, 15, 14, 13, 12, 11, 10, 9, 8, 7, 6, 5, 4, 3, 2, 1 to the top 20 classified finishers in each race.

References

External links
 Official website of the Formula Renault 2.0 NEC championship

NEC
Formula Renault 2.0 NEC
Formula Renault 2.0 NEC
Renault NEC